Lisin was a Mesopotamian deity initially regarded as a goddess and addressed as ama, "mother," who later came to be regarded as a god and developed an association with fire. The name was also applied to a star associated with Nabu. Lisin's spouse was Ninsikila, whose gender also changed between periods. It was believed that they had eight children. The initial cult center of Lisin is uncertain, with locations such as Adab and Kesh being often proposed. She is attested in texts from various cities, including Umma, Lagash, Nippur and Meturan. Only a single literary text focused on Lisin is known, a lament in which she mourns the death of one of her sons, for which she blames her mother Ninhursag. Both female and male version of Lisin also appears in other similar texts.

Name and character
Lisin's name was written as 𒀭𒉈 (dLi9-si4) in cuneiform. It is sometimes transcribed as Lisi instead. The reading with n as the final consonant is based on genitive forms in which the final sign is na (𒋜), such as the theophoric name Geme-Lisina. Due to uncertainties about sign values, the spelling dNE.GÙN was used in early Assyriological literature, but it was possible to establish the correct reading based on ancient lexical lists providing pronunciation glosses. The meaning of the name is unknown.

It has been argued that Lisin's standing in the Mesopotamian pantheon was initially high, but her character remains poorly known. She is addressed as ama, "mother," in an Early Dynastic zame hymn. Authors such as Jeremy Black, Anthony Green and Gebhard Selz, relying on this fact, state that she was a mother goddess. However, Julia M. Asher-Greve in a general overview of the use of the epithets "mother" and "father" in Mesopotamian texts states that they often simply designated major members of the pantheon, and in some cases might reflect the authority of a given goddess, rather than association with motherhood. According to Dina Katz, Lisin could be portrayed as a mourning mother similar to Duttur. Despite ama being her most common epithet, Lisin eventually came to be seen as a male deity in later periods.

In incantations, Lisin could be associated with a variety of materials, including hūlu and kibrītu, both presumed to be minerals, horn of the gazelle, and medicinal plants ninû, azupiru, and sahlû.

Later reinterpretation
In various esoteric texts, an association between Lisin and fire and burning developed. An explanatory text, referred to as The Weapon Name Exposition by Alasdair Livingstone, includes an invented Akkadian etymology of Lisin's name. The deity, in this case treated as male, is described as "he who burns with fire" and "he who burns on an offering," relying on the use of the first sign of the name to write the verb qalû, "to burn," and the second one to represent the nouns izi and išātu, "fire." A third explanation of the name provided, "the handsome one, the burning one," relies on explaining the first sign as banû, and on treating izi, the value previously established for the second one as analogous to qalû.

According to Markhan Geller, an Udug Hul incantation in which Lisin, in this text referred to as a goddess, appears when ingredients needed for the ritual are cooked might also depend on the association with fire. The fact that an esoteric text which equates deities with various materials and objects assigns white fumes to Lisin is also presumed to depend on a similar invented etymology.

In Mesopotamian astronomy
In Mesopotamian astronomy, the name of Lisin was the designation of the star known today as α Scorpionis. First references to it are known from texts from the first millennium BCE. Based on the fact that the star could also be referred to as "the breast of the scorpion" (mulGABA GIR2.TAB), Gabriella Spada argues that Lisin herself was at some point associated with scorpions. The compendium MUL.APIN states that praying to the star Lisin when it was visible in the sky could secure good luck as long as all members of the petitioner's household were woken up to partake. According to Hermann Hunger, despite the origin of its name, the star was associated with Nabu.

Associations with other deities
Ninhursag was regarded as Lisin's mother, and Šulpae as her father. Her brother was Ashgi. Her spouse was Ninsikila, and eight children are assigned to them in the god list An = Anum: KU-anna, KU-kita, KU-ta-abzu, KU-kita-abzu (reading of the first sign in all four names is uncertain), Irḫangul, Kituš-Keš, Lalanna (or Lulalanna) and Urnuntae.

In the role of a mourning goddess, Lisin could be equated with other similar deities. One text implicitly conflates her with Ninhursag, Dingirmah and Ninmug.

In a ritual text from the first millennium BCE, Lisin appears as a member of the household of Nanaya alongside deities such as Qibi-dumqi and Uṣur-amāssu.

The gender of Lisin and Ninsikila
In texts postdating the Old Babylonian period, and uncommonly also earlier, the genders of Lisin and Ninsikila were switched around, and in the god list An = Anum the former is male and the latter female. The fact that in Old Babylonian god lists Lisin precedes Ninsikila might have influenced the reinterpretation of their gender. Furthermore, it is also possible the existence of a Dilmunite goddess homophonous, but not identical, with Ninsikila, whose original name was Meskilak but who came to be referred to as Ninsikila in Mesopotamia, was a factor.

According to Westenholz, the gender of Lisin did not change in laments, in which she continued to be addressed as a female deity in later periods. However, Paul Delnero states that a fragment of a single lament in which Lisin is male is known. Lisin is also treated as a female deity in Udug Hul, a corpus of incantations which remained in circulation until the end of the use of cuneiform in Mesopotamia.

Worship
Oldest known attestations of Lisin have been identified in texts from Abu Salabikh. It has been proposed that this site might have been her initial cult center, but this theory is not universally accepted, and it is generally assumed that it is not known which city she was associated with. Another proposal links her with Sirara. In the Early Dynastic zame hymns, she is associated with a settlement named Ĝišgi. Authors such as Piotr Michalowski, Jeremy Black and Anthony Green assume that her primary cult centers were Adab and Kesh. According to Marcos Such-Gutiérrez attestations of Lisin from Adab are limited to theophoric names from the Early Dynastic and Old Akkadian periods, such as Ur-Lisin (attested in both periods) and Gan-Lisin (attested only in the latter). It has also been argued that the fact one of her children, Kituš-Keš ("Kesh is the residence"), was named after Kesh confirms the assumption she was associated with it. The fact a month named itiezem-dLi9-si4 is attested in texts from Tell al-Wilayah has been used to argue this site corresponds to Kesh. The worship of Lisin is also documented in sources from Umma, Lagash, Nippur and Meturan.

In the local calendar of Umma, the third month, iti dLi9-si4, was named after Lisin, but there is no indication that any festival dedicated to her took place at this time, which might mean it was borrowed from the calendar of another city. A temple dedicated to her is mentioned in one of the inscriptions of Lugalzagesi. The Canonical Temple List, most likely composed in the second half of the Kassite period, as well as other sources, also mention the existence of a temple of Lisin, Euršaba (possibly to be translated from Sumerian as "house, oracle of the heart"), which according to Andrew R. George was located in Umma. It has to be distinguished with the better attested Euršaba in Borsippa, which was dedicated to Nanaya, rather than Lisin. Texts from Umma also document offerings made to Lisin. Furthermore, at one point a man bearing the theophoric name Ur-Lisin served as the governor of this city.

Texts from the state of Lagash mention the itu ezem dLi8-si4(-na), "month of the festival of Lisin." In the Early Dynastic period it was the seventh or eighth month in the local calendar, and took place five or six months before the harvest, but later on it became the third month, and occurred eight months before the harvest season. As of 1993, no information was available on the celebrations which took place during it, with the exception of a reference to offerings on the day of the new moon in Urub, which did not involve the goddess in mention. In a more recent publication, Markham J. Geller states that a festival dedicated to Lisin took place at this time in the Ur III period, but no details are provided in known texts, and while he assumes it might have involved funerary offerings, no primary sources directly supporting this theory are available. Other evidence for the worship of Lisin in lagash includes a single text mentions a water reservoir at the temple of Lisin, whose precise location remains unknown, and theophoric names such as Ur-Lisin and ḪE-Lisin (reading of the first sign uncertain). Gebhard Selz notes that the small number of attestations of Lisin from Lagash is unexpected and contrasts with her apparent importance implied by the month name, the existence of a location associated with her, and other evidence.

Later evidence of the worship of Lisin is less common, and it is presumed that she lost her initial importance at some point in the Old Babylonian period or earlier. In Larsa, a certain Ṣālilum dedicated a diorite bowl for the life of Rim-Sîn I to Lisin and Ninsikila, according to Douglas Frayne with former to be interpreted as a god and the latter as a goddess. However, according to Gabriella Spada it is also possible that Lisin is female in this text. She also appears in a legal text from the reign of the same king which might be an example of a so-called "temple loan," as it presents her as the creditor who borrowed a certain amount of silver to two people. In Nippur Lisin is attested in an offering list from the end of the Isin-Larsa period and in theophoric names such as Lisin-ummi and Lisin-bani. She is also present in the Nippur god list, in which she occurs between Uttu and Alammuš. Texts focused on Lisin have also been found during the excavations in Meturan, and according to Antoine Cavigneaux and Farouk Al-Rawi might indicate the existence of a local cult of this goddess there in the Old Babylonian period. She is attested in theophoric names from this site, Lisina-akkam and Lu-Lisina, the latter known from a seal with an inscription documenting the onwer's personal devotion to this goddess. A possible late reference to Lisin occurs in a ritual text from Babylon which lists various deities worshiped alongside Nanaya in her temple Euršaba who accompanied her during a journey to Kish.

Mythology
Only a single literary composition focused on Lisin is known. It is referred to as Lisin A in Assyriological literature, following the Electronic Text Corpus of Sumerian Literature naming system. It was most likely composed in the Old Babylonian period, and copies are known from various locations, including Ur, Nippur and Meturan. It was a part of the curriculum of scribal schools, and some of the known copies have the composition Enlil and Namzitara inscribed on the reverse. Since the Meturan copy of has been found in a house whose inhabitant, a certain Bēlšunu, had relatives bearing theophoric names invoking Lisin, it is possible the text was connected to the active worship of this goddess. It focuses on her lament over the death of her son. She apparently blames her mother, Ninhursag, for it. The text states that her cries reached the cult center of the latter, Adab. Some of the known copies have the composition Enlil and Namzitara inscribed in reverse.

Lisin is also referenced in a single line of the lament Egime and Lulil, which also describes her as a mourning goddess. In an emesal text which might be a lament focused on a presently unidentified dying god, she appears alongside goddesses such as Nintinugga, Ninisina, Ninmug and Ereš'ugga. A fragment of another lament in which Ninhursag apparently mourns Lisin, here presented as a male deity and her son, is also known.

References

Bibliography

Mesopotamian goddesses
Mesopotamian gods
Fire goddesses
Fire gods
Mother goddesses